The Sweetwater River Bridge was built in 1929 to carry Ca highway 94 over the Sweetwater River in San Diego County, California, US.

External links
Bridgehunter profile
Historic Steel Bridge in San Diego County

Bridges in San Diego County, California
Road bridges in California
Steel bridges in the United States
Bridges completed in 1951
Bridges completed in 1970
Interstate 8
U.S. Route 80
Bridges on the Interstate Highway System
1929 establishments in California